The gianduiotto is chocolate originally from Piedmont, in northern Italy. Gianduiotti are shaped like ingots and individually wrapped in a (usually) gold- or silver-colored foil cover. It is a specialty of Turin, and takes its name from gianduja, the preparation of chocolate and hazelnut used for gianduiotti and other sweets (including Nutella and bicerin di Gianduiotto). This preparation itself is named after Gianduja, a mask in commedia dell'arte, a type of Italian theater, that represents the archetypal Piedmontese. Indeed, Gianduja's hat inspired the shape of the gianduiotto.

Gianduiotti are produced from a paste of sugar, cocoa and hazelnut Tonda Gentile delle Langhe. The official "birth" of gianduiotti was in 1852 in Turin, by Pierre Paul Caffarel and Michele Prochet, the first to completely grind hazelnuts into a paste before adding them to the cocoa and sugar mix.

The idea of mixing hazelnut pieces to "standard" chocolates is said to have arisen during Napoleon's reign, when importing cocoa from South America became difficult. With "raw" cocoa's high prices, local producers started incorporating bits of roasted hazelnuts (which were locally grown and readily available in Piedmont) to make the final product more affordable.

References

Italian chocolate
Cuisine of Piedmont
Culture in Turin